The 2017–18 Kent State Golden Flashes women's basketball team represents Kent State University during the 2017–18 NCAA Division I women's basketball season. The Golden Flashes, led by second year head coach Todd Starkey, play their home games at the Memorial Athletic and Convocation Center, also known as the MAC Center, as members of the East Division of the Mid-American Conference. They finished the season 13–19, 5–13 in MAC play to finish in fourth place in the West Division. They advanced to the quarterfinals of the MAC women's tournament where they lost to Buffalo.

Previous season
The Flashes finished the 2016–17 regular season with a 19–11 overall record and 13–5 in MAC play. They won their first East division title since 2005, clinching a share on March 1 and winning it outright on March 4.

Roster

Schedule

|-
!colspan=9 style=| Non-conference regular season

|-
!colspan=9 style=| MAC regular season

|-
!colspan=9 style=| MAC Tournament

See also
 2017–18 Kent State Golden Flashes men's basketball team

References

Kent State
Kent State Golden Flashes women's basketball seasons
Kent State
Kent State